WASP-56 is a sun-like star of spectral type G6 in the constellation of Coma Berenices. It has an apparent magnitude of 11.48. Observations at the Calar Alto Observatory using the lucky imaging technique detected a candidate companion star located 3.4 arc seconds away, however it is not known if this is an actual binary companion or an optical double.

Planetary system
It has a planet that was discovered by transit photometry in 2011 by the SuperWASP program. Fourteen transits were observed over three watching seasons, each lasting 214 minutes and reducing the stars' brightness by 14 millimagnitudes. The planet has around 0.6 times the mass of Jupiter and an orbital period of 4.6 days. The planet possibly has a large core of heavy metals.

References

Coma Berenices
G-type main-sequence stars
Solar analogs
Planetary systems with one confirmed planet
Planetary transit variables
J12132790+2303205